Joseph Francis Klukay a.k.a. "The Duke of Padocah" (November 6, 1922 – February 3, 2006) was a professional Canadian ice hockey forward. He was born in Sault Ste. Marie, Ontario.

Klukay began his National Hockey League career with the Toronto Maple Leafs in 1943.  He also played for the Boston Bruins.  He left the NHL following the 1956 season and played several more years in the Ontario Senior Hockey League with the Windsor Bulldogs before retiring from hockey altogether in 1964. In his career, he won 4 Stanley Cups and 1 Allan Cup. Klukay was the first Sault Ste. Marie native to play in the NHL All Star Game, doing so with the Maple Leafs during the first three official installments from 1947-1949.

Awards and achievements
 1947 Stanley Cup Championship (Toronto)
 1948 Stanley Cup Championship (Toronto)
 1949 Stanley Cup Championship (Toronto)
 1951 Stanley Cup Championship (Toronto)
 1963 Allan Cup Championship (Windsor)

Career statistics

Regular season and playoffs

External links
 
 Obituary
 

1922 births
2006 deaths
Boston Bruins players
Sportspeople from Sault Ste. Marie, Ontario
Pittsburgh Hornets players
Stanley Cup champions
Toronto Maple Leafs players
Ice hockey people from Ontario
Canadian ice hockey left wingers
Canadian expatriates in the United States